Paulose Pandari Kunnel (born 21 May 1977 in Kannur, Kerala) is an Indian rower that participated in the 2004 Summer Olympics. He participated in the Rowing at the 2004 Summer Olympics – Men's single sculls, and placed 3rd on 19 August E event .

References
 sports-reference

1977 births
Indian male rowers
Malayali people
Rowers at the 2004 Summer Olympics
Living people
Asian Games medalists in rowing
Rowers at the 2002 Asian Games
Sportspeople from Kannur
Asian Games bronze medalists for India
Medalists at the 2002 Asian Games
Olympic rowers of India